Ignatiy Mikhailovich Nesterov (Uzbek: Ignatiy Mixaylovich Nesterov, Russian: Игнатий Михайлович Нестеров) (born 20 June 1983, in Samarkand) is an Uzbek football goalkeeper of Russian origin who plays for Lokomotiv Tashkent.

Apart from a short-term spell at Saudi Arabian club Ohod, Nesterov has spent his entire footballing career in Uzbekistan. The most-decorated Uzbek player at club level, he won ten Uzbek Leagues and ten Uzbek Cups. For the Uzbek national team, he has participated in five Asian Cups (2004, 2007, 2011, 2015 and 2019).

Club career

Early career
Before signing for Pakhtakor, Nesterov played for FK Samarqand-Dinamo.

Pakhtakor
He played for Pakhtakor from 2002 to 2009. By playing for Pakhtakor Nesterov he became the first-choice goalkeeper of the national team.

Bunyodkor
In July 2009 Nesterov moved to Bunyodkor, signing a 3.5 years contract with the club.

Lokomotiv
On 10 December 2013 the press service of Lokomotiv announced a contract signing with Nesterov. The terms of the deal were not disclosed. He was linked with Asian giants Persepolis of Iran in January 2016.

Honours

Club
Pakhtakor
 Uzbek League (6): 2002, 2003, 2004, 2005, 2006, 2007 
 Uzbek Cup (6): 2002, 2003, 2004, 2005, 2006, 2007
 CIS cup: 2007
 AFC Champions League semi-final (2): 2003, 2004

Bunyodkor
 Uzbek League (4): 2009, 2010, 2011, 2013
 Uzbek Cup (3): 2010, 2012, 2013
 AFC Champions League semi-final (1): 2012

Lokomotiv
 Uzbek League runners-up (1): 2014
 Uzbek Cup (1): 2014

Personal life
Nesterov is of Russian ancestry and a devout Orthodox Christian, he has multiple tattoos refer to his Christian faith، he is bilingual speaking Russian and Uzbek

See also
 List of footballers with 100 or more caps

References

External links
Profile

1983 births
Living people
Uzbekistani footballers
Uzbekistani expatriate footballers
Uzbekistani people of Russian descent
Uzbekistan international footballers
2004 AFC Asian Cup players
2007 AFC Asian Cup players
2011 AFC Asian Cup players
2015 AFC Asian Cup players
Pakhtakor Tashkent FK players
FC Bunyodkor players
FK Dinamo Samarqand players
Association football goalkeepers
Footballers at the 2006 Asian Games
PFC Lokomotiv Tashkent players
Uzbekistan Super League players
Ohod Club players
Saudi Professional League players
2019 AFC Asian Cup players
Expatriate footballers in Saudi Arabia
FIFA Century Club
Asian Games competitors for Uzbekistan